The System suitcase is one of two principal files comprising the classic Mac OS from the original release to OS 9.2.2, the other being the Macintosh Finder. The suitcase is located in the System Folder along with the Finder file and contains keyboard layouts, FKEY resources, sounds, and in System 6, bitmap fonts, and Desk Accessories. In versions released up to and including System 6, the Font/DA Mover has to be used to move these into or out of the System suitcase.

During the development System 7 and subsequent releases, many of the user-serviceable items stored in the System suitcase were moved into separate folders. For System 7, individual file types can contain these resources, allowing sounds, fonts, and desk accessories to be moved into separate files, and the Finder can open and modify the contents of such files.  Opening a sound file causes the Finder to play the sound, opening a font shows a preview of the font being used, and the operating system treats Desk Accessories as if they were applications. Along with the Control Panels folder, Desk Accessories are located in the Apple Menu Items folder. System 7.1 includes the Fonts folder, which loads all resources (including fonts) contained in font files or font suitcases found within the Fonts folder as if they were part of the System suitcase.

Easter eggs 

In System 6, the string "Help! Help! We're being held prisoner in a system software factory!" appears in the data fork of the System file.  During System 7 development, it was updated to "Help! Help! We're still being held prisoner in a system software factory!". Later versions of System 7 contain other variations of the message. A list of credits also follows in each case.

Classic Mac OS